Ambaran     is a village in Khwahan Badakhshan Province in north-eastern Afghanistan.

References 

Populated places in Khwahan District